Clement Saxton (1724–1810) was High Sheriff of Berkshire.

Biography
Clement Saxton was born in 1724, the eldest son of Edward Saxton, a merchant of London and Abingdon, and his wife Mary, née Bush. The family's country estate was Circourt Manor at Denchworth in Berkshire (now Oxfordshire). He was educated at John Roysse's Free School in Abingdon, (now Abingdon School). His brother Charles became the 1st Baronet of the Saxton baronets in 1794.

Clement lived at Caldecott House in Abingdon. He was commissioned as a Captain in the Berkshire Militia by 1762 and was promoted to Lieutenant-Colonel by 1779; he resigned on 28 August  1787. He was also appointed High Sheriff of Berkshire  for 1777.

See also
 List of Old Abingdonians

References

1724 births
1810 deaths
Royal Berkshire Militia officers
High Sheriffs of Berkshire
People educated at Abingdon School
People from Abingdon-on-Thames
People from Vale of White Horse (district)